Late preterm infants are infants born at a gestational age between  weeks and  weeks. They have higher morbidity and mortality rates than term infants (gestational age ≥37 weeks) due to their relative physiologic and metabolic immaturity, even though they are often the size and weight of some term infants. "Late preterm" has replaced "near term" to describe this group of infants, since near term incorrectly implies that these infants are "almost term" and only require routine neonatal care.

In 2005, late-preterm births accounted for more than 70% of all preterm births (<37 weeks’ gestation), or approximately 377,000 infants. In fact, much of the increase in the preterm birth rate in recent years can be attributed to increases in late-preterm births.

Risk Factors 
Several important factors that may predispose late-preterm infants to medical conditions associated with immaturity:
 respiratory distress
 apnea
 temperature instability
 hypoglycemia
 hyperbilirubinemia
 poor feeding

At 34–35 weeks, the brain weight is only about  that of a full-term baby.  This may lead to an increased risk of:
 Mental retardation
 Developmental delay/disability
 Special needs – education
 Retention in kindergarten
 Cerebral palsy

Neonatal Nutrition
Late preterm infants have immature gastrointestinal function and feeding difficulties that predispose them to in increase in enterohepatic circulation, decreased stool frequency, dehydration, and hyperbilirubinemia. Feeding during the birth hospitalization may be transiently successful, but not sustained after discharge. Feeding difficulties are associated with relatively low oromotor tone, function, and neural maturation also predispose these infants to dehydration and hyperbilirubinemia.

Late Preterm Infants have an increased risk of being underweight and stunted at 12 and 24 months of age versus term infants.

Proper nutrition is essential for normal growth, optimal neurologic and cognitive development, immune protection, and long term health.

Feeding
The last trimester of pregnancy the fetus is expressing active amino acid transport, calcium, lipid transfer, and glucose facilitated diffusion.  Delivery of the premature infant requires higher energy expenditure, but with inadequate intake the infant will have negative nitrogen balance.  There are higher needs for Calcium, Phosphorus, and Vitamin D.

Early Nutrition and Cognitive Outcome
For every 10 kcal/kg increase in energy intake in the first week of life, there is a 4.6 points increase in MDI (Mental Development Index) at 18 months. For every 1 g/kg increase in protein intake in the first week of life, 8.2 point increase in MDI at 18 months.

Challenges to Feeding
 Small mouth and immature oral muscle
 Weak suck and poor latch
 Easily tire with feeding
 Maternal delayed milk production

When To Start Feeding

Factors such as hemodynamic stability, severe IUGR, respiratory, abdominal exam, whether feeding cues are present, and stable glucose could all effect the timing of nutrition.  Some preterm infants will be NPO (nil per os).  If infants are unable to start oral or enteral intake intravenous fluids may begin with amino acids or total parenteral nutrition.

According to the American Academy of Pediatrics section on breastfeeding recommendations are all infants should receive human milk.

Nutrient Needs by Gestational Age

Fortifiers
Use caution when fortifying single nutrients to prevent alteration of protein/energy ratio.  Center for Disease Control (CDC) recommends that sterile formulas and fortifiers be used when mom is not available.  Powdered formula and HMF may be contaminants. Start with the mom's diet during breastfeeding.  Mom should be eating adequate calories, protein, B vitamins and DHA.

How Much

Colostrum Production
Colostrum production can range from 26-56 mL the first day to 113-185 mL for day two.  Although colostrum production is not voluminous, it can still meet the needs of the newborn.

Feeding Methods
 Direct Breast Feeding
 Feeding tube at breast
 Cup/Finger feeding
 Bottle Feeding
 Gavage Tube (bolus feeding)

Strategies to Improve Outcome

Early Nutrition

 Colostrum Diet; Mother's own milk [Contains: Lactoferrin, Secretory IgA, Lysozyme, contains oligosaccharides (beneficial growth of good gut bacteria), and hormones]
 Trophic Feeds (beneficial effect on maturation of the intestinal tract)
 Donor Milk
 Fortify human milk
 Consistency in feedings important

References

External links
 AWHONN Association of Women's Health, Obstetric and Neonatal Nurses Resource for Late preterm infant
 2012 AAP-Section on Perinatal Pediatrics  Workshop on Perinatal Practice Strategies: Late preterm infants

Preterm birth
Midwifery